Club Social y Deportivo Municipal may refer to two different sports clubs:
 C.S.D. Municipal or Club Social y Deportivo Municipal, Guatemala City, Guatemala
 Club Social y Deportivo Municipal (Argentina), Corrientes, Argentina